Followers is a 2021 British found footage horror film directed by Marcus Harben, starring Harry Jarvis, Loreece Harrison, Nina Wadia and Erin Austene.

Premise
A struggling social media influencer discovers the house he shares is haunted. The ghost brings him and his friends fame and fortune, but with deadly consequences.

Cast
 Harry Jarvis as Jonty Craig
 Loreece Harrison as Zauna
 Nina Wadia as Becky Dubar
 Erin Austene as Amber
 Daniel Cahill as Pete
 Dominic Watters as Jim
 Jessica Webber as Dawn
 Orion Lee as Edward Lee
 Tanya Burr as Ilana Clark

Release
The film was released in the United Kingdom on 18 March 2022.

Reception
Martin Unsworth of Starburst rated the film 3 stars out of 5, writing that "there’s enough wit amongst the scares to make it work." Brendan Jesus of Horror Obsessive wrote a positive review of the film, calling it "a fresh and exciting installment to the found footage subgenre."

Phil Hoad of The Guardian rated the film 2 stars out of 5, writing that the film "has a few sharp moments, but never quite reconciles its two sides to cleanly deliver the social-media skewering it’s obviously itching to." Film critic Kim Newman wrote that while the film "has a couple of creepy moments and scares", the "plot turns out to be more complex than usual, leading to a finale with revelations and stand-offs and perhaps one twist too many." Alain Elliott of Nerdly wrote a negative review of the film, writing that it "wants to be some kind of modern social media version of Paranormal Activity but it fails at every level".

References

External links
 
 

British horror films
2021 horror films
Found footage films
Films about social media